Cilmeri railway station is a railway station serving the village of Cilmeri, in Powys, mid Wales. The station is located in a rural setting just to the south of the A483.

Facilities

The station is unstaffed (like almost all others on the line), with a single active platform and basic amenities (CIS display, help point and timetable information board). Step-free access is provided from the station entrance to the platform, though the access path is unmade and somewhat uneven.

Services
All trains serving the station are operated by Transport for Wales. There are four trains a day in each direction from Monday to Saturday, and two services on Sundays.

References

Further reading

External links 

Video footage and history of Cilmeri Station

Railway stations in Powys
DfT Category F2 stations
Former London and North Western Railway stations
Railway stations in Great Britain opened in 1867
Heart of Wales Line
Railway stations served by Transport for Wales Rail
Railway request stops in Great Britain